The Stinson 108 was a popular general aviation aircraft produced by the Stinson division of the American airplane company Consolidated Vultee, from immediately after World War II to 1950. It was developed from the prewar Model 10A Voyager. Stinson was bought by Piper Aircraft in 1949. All Stinson model 108, 108-1, 108-2, 108-3 and 108-4 aircraft were built by Stinson at Wayne, Michigan.  When Stinson sold the type certificate to Piper in 1949, approximately 325 airplanes of the 5,260 model 108s built by Stinson were complete but unsold. These 325 model 108s went to Piper as part of the sale.  Piper then sold that inventory as the Piper-Stinson over the next few years.

Design and development
The fuselage was of fabric-covered steel tube. Aftermarket modifiers have obtained supplemental type certificates (STC) allowing conversion to an aluminum covering. Many different engines have been installed in the 108 by STC such as the Lycoming O-360, Franklin O-350, Continental O-470.

One distinctive feature was the partial leading edge slot installed on the wings and aligned with the ailerons on the trailing edge, ensuring that the portion of the wing containing the aileron remains unstalled at higher angles of attack, thus contributing to docile stall behavior.

Total new production of the Stinson Model 108, by Stinson, was 5,260; this total does not include the two converted prototypes. Stinson delivered approximately 4,935 aircraft and Piper delivered approximately 325 aircraft.  Piper later sold the type certificate to Univair Aircraft Corporation. Univair built and certified the model 108-5, but built only one example.  Total new model production by Stinson and Univair was 5,261 aircraft.

Variants

The 108 variants closely resemble each other but can be visually distinguished by their design changes:
Prototype 108
Two prototype model 108s were converted from Stinson model 10A airframes. FAA records show NX31519 was model 108 serial number 1, and NX31532 is model 108 serial number 2.  Both registrations later changed to NC. The production model straight 108 would also use serial number 1 and 2, so there was for a short period 2 duplicate serial numbers;
108 Voyager 125
Powered by a  Lycoming O-235 piston engine.
108 Voyager 150
Powered by a  Franklin 6A4-150-B31, B3 or B4 piston engine. 742 built in 1946.
108-1
Slightly modified version with external baggage door. 1508 built 1947–1948.
108-2
Powered by  Franklin 6A4-165-B3 or -B5. 1250 built from May 1948. There was a conversion kit to add the rudder trim to the earlier airplanes advertised.

108-3
The 108-3 introduced a taller vertical fin with a rudder featuring a straight trailing edge. Larger fuel tanks ( versus ) were also fitted.
108-4
The 108-4 was a higher powered model 108, sn 108-4693, NX149C, not certified, flown experimentally by Stinson, later by Piper, 1 built.
Flying Station Wagon
The "Flying Station Wagon" version was an option available with the -1, -2 and -3 models, had a utility interior  incorporated wood paneling and a reinforced floor, allowing  of baggage in the passenger compartment. The aircraft could be fitted with wheel, float or ski landing gear. The single 108-4 built was a Flying Station Wagon.
108-5
A single 108-5 was built by Univair, who purchased the Stinson 108 type certificate from Piper, in 1964. The 108-5 used a  Franklin 6A-335-B1 engine. Univair offered kits to convert earlier aircraft to this standard. The 108-5 brought total model 108 production to 5,261, of which 5,135 were built by Stinson, 125 by Piper, and 1 by Univair.

Operators

Spanish Air Force operated eighteen 108-3 aircraft, with the designation L.2.

Specifications (108 Voyager 150)

See also

References

Further reading

External links

High-wing aircraft
1940s United States civil utility aircraft
Model 108
Single-engined tractor aircraft